Jashia Judith Luña Alfaro (born December 28, 1978, in Guadalajara, Jalisco) is a female diver from Mexico. She represented her native country at three consecutive Summer Olympics starting in 2000.

References
 

1978 births
Living people
Mexican female divers
Olympic divers of Mexico
Divers at the 2000 Summer Olympics
Divers at the 2004 Summer Olympics
Divers at the 2008 Summer Olympics
Divers at the 2003 Pan American Games
Central American and Caribbean Games gold medalists for Mexico
Universiade medalists in diving
Sportspeople from Guadalajara, Jalisco
Competitors at the 2006 Central American and Caribbean Games
Universiade silver medalists for Mexico
Universiade bronze medalists for Mexico
Central American and Caribbean Games medalists in diving
Medalists at the 2005 Summer Universiade
Pan American Games competitors for Mexico
20th-century Mexican women
21st-century Mexican women